Georges Borchardt is a literary agent in America; he has represented such figures as General Charles de Gaulle to Jane Fonda.

Early life

Born in Berlin in 1928, Borchardt was in France with his family when war broke out in 1939; his father died when Borchardt was a child of eleven. He spent his teenage years hiding in plain sight, as an undocumented student in Aix-en-Provence, relying on strangers to protect him after his mother and most of his family perished in concentration camps.  Borchardt emigrated to the US in 1947, settling in New York.

Career

Borchardt's first job in New York was as an assistant in a literary agency specializing in foreign writers.  In 1959, it was Borchardt who secured an American publisher for Elie Wiesel's Night, following rejection after rejection by publishers who labeled the memoir of Wiesel's internment in concentration camps too morbid for American readers. Night has sold more than six million copies in the United States alone.

Borchardt is responsible for the American publication of the first works by Samuel Beckett. He also introduced to American readers major works by Roland Barthes, Pierre Bourdieu, Marguerite Duras, Frantz Fanon, Michel Foucault, Eugène Ionesco, Jacques Lacan, Alain Robbe-Grillet, Laurent de Brunhoff and Jean-Paul Sartre.

Borchardt has lectured widely on publishing.  He has served on the board of International PEN and as president of the Association of Authors' Representatives (AAR).

In 1967, Borchardt branched out on his own, establishing his New York-based literary agency, Georges Borchardt, Inc., with the assistance of his wife, Anne Bolton Borchardt.  Their daughter, Valerie Borchardt, joined the agency in 1999.

The Borchardt agency represents many important authors, including Elie Wiesel, Ian McEwan, Jerome Charyn, Robert Coover, and T. C. Boyle, who once described Borchardt as "the most wonderful man who ever lived on this earth." The agency also handles the literary legacy of the estates of Tennessee Williams, Hannah Arendt, John Gardner, Stanley Elkin and Aldous Huxley.

Among the agency's more than 200 authors are eight Pulitzer Prize and five Nobel Prize winners.

Legion of Honor

On October 25, 2010, Georges Borchardt was awarded the insignia of Chevalier of the Legion of Honor, France's highest award.

References

External links 

Finding aid to Georges Borchardt papers at Columbia University. Rare Book & Manuscript Library.

Bibliography

 http://www.pw.org/content/agents_editors_qampa_agent_georges_borchardt
 http://www.frenchculture.org/spip.php?article3789
 http://www.thejewishweek.com/features/beginning/frances_honorable_agent
 http://gbagency.com/index.html
 http://gbagency.com/authors.html
 https://web.archive.org/web/20110622062951/http://www.themodernword.com/second_level.html
 http://frenchmorning.com/ny/2010/10/26/georges-borchardt-agent-dinfluence/
 http://www.nyu.edu/about/news-publications/news/2007/10/03/in_conversation_renowned.html

Honors

Awarded the Legion of Honor in 2010

1928 births
Literary agents
American literary agencies
Living people
German emigrants to the United States